The following are the national records in athletics in Kosovo maintained by the Kosovo Athletic Federation.

Outdoor

Key to tables:

NWI = no wind information

# = not ratified by federation and/or IAAF

Men

Women

Indoor

Men

Women

References
Kosovan Outdoor Records – Men 26 April 2021 updated
Kosovan Outdoor Records – Women 2 August 2020 updated
World Athletics Statistic Handbook 2019: National Outdoor Records

External links
Kosovo Athletics Federation web site

Kosovo
Records
Athletics
Athletics